Magdalena Maleeva was the defending champion but lost in the second round to Jennifer Capriati.

Jana Novotná won in the final 6–4, 3–6, 6–1 against Capriati.

Seeds
A champion seed is indicated in bold text while text in italics indicates the round in which that seed was eliminated. The top four seeds received a bye to the second round.

  Monica Seles (semifinals)
  Jana Novotná (champion)
  Lindsay Davenport (quarterfinals)
  Iva Majoli (second round)
  Martina Hingis (semifinals)
  Mary Joe Fernández (second round)
  Brenda Schultz-McCarthy (quarterfinals)
  Magdalena Maleeva (second round)

Draw

Final

Section 1

Section 2

External links
 1996 Ameritech Cup Draw

Ameritech Cup
1996 WTA Tour
1996 in sports in Illinois
1996 in American tennis